Coullemont is a commune in the Pas-de-Calais department in the Hauts-de-France region of France.

Geography
A small farming village located 15 miles (24 km) southwest of Arras at the junction of the D23 and D80 roads, on the border with the département of the Somme.

Population

Places of interest
 The church of St.Nicholas, dating from the thirteenth century.
 A Commonwealth War Graves Commission grave.

See also
Communes of the Pas-de-Calais department

References

External links

 The CWGC grave

Communes of Pas-de-Calais